Onosma taurica, the golden-flowered onosma, is a plant native to Europe.

External links
 https://www.first-nature.com/flowers/onosma-taurica.php

taurica